Only Words may refer to:
 Only Words, a book by Catharine MacKinnon
 "Only Words", a song from the album Deborah by Debbie Gibson